Ma Tau Wai (originally , historically ) is an area in the Kowloon City District, Kowloon, Hong Kong. It was originally a walled village (Cantonese: Wai) between present-day Argyle Street and Prince Edward Road West, east of present-day St. Teresa's Hospital.

The area of Ma Tau Wai is not as well-defined as the original village, as the geographic features have been lost. 

The public housing estate Ma Tau Wai Estate is named after the area / the original village.

Other landmark of the areas
Hong Kong's Notre Dame College is in Ma Tau Wai.

New Asia College, one of three founding colleges of the Chinese University of Hong Kong, was located near Tin Kwong Road (天光道) and Farm Road. After the college moved to Ma Liu Shui, Sha Tin, New Asia Middle School was founded at the former campus.

See also
Ma Tau Chung
Ma Tau Kok

References

External links

 Report on the Collapse of the Building at 45J Ma Tau Wai Road … on 29 January 2010, HKG Buildings Dept.

 
Kowloon City District
Populated places in Hong Kong